Aminevo (Ämin) is a rural locality (a selo) in Arslanovsky Selsoviet, Chishminsky District, Bashkortostan, Russia. The population was 442 as of 2010. There are 5 streets.

Geography 
Aminevo is located 22 km northwest of Chishmy (the district's administrative centre) by road. Novaya is the nearest rural locality.

References 

Rural localities in Chishminsky District